The 2013 Dashtestan earthquake struck near the city of Borazjan (the capital of Dashtestan County, Bushehr Province) in southern Iran on November 28 at a depth of . The shock had a moment magnitude of 5.6 on the Richter scale and a maximum perceived intensity of VII (Very strong) on the Mercalli intensity scale. The earthquake killed at least 7 people and   injured 45 others.

See also 
List of earthquakes in 2013
List of earthquakes in Iran

References

External links

2013 earthquakes
2013 in Iran
Earthquakes in Iran
November 2013 events in Iran